() is a town located in Hidaka Subprefecture, Hokkaido, Japan. The name of the town means 'between the rocky cliffs' in the Ainu language.

As of September 2016, the town has an estimated population of 5,305 and a density of 7.1 persons per km2. The total area is 743.16 km2.

Ainu culture
The Nibutani Dam was constructed in  district on the Saru River, though there was a strong objection due to a sacred meaning of the place for indigenous Ainu people. Nibutani is the site of the Ainu Cultural center. Nibutani's best known son is perhaps Shigeru Kayano, a 20th-century advocate for the Ainu and Ainu language and culture. The cultural landscape along the Saru River consisting of Ainu traditions and modern settlement within Biratori has been designated an Important Cultural Landscape.

Economy
Biratori is primarily an agricultural town, growing many different kinds of fruits and vegetables for people and livestock. Tomatoes are one of the top products of the town. It was also known for its lumber industry.

Tourist attractions
Some noteworthy attractions in Biratori:

 Biratori Onsen Yukara
 Family Land
 Nibutani and the Nibutani Ainu Culture Museum
 Suzuran Field in Memu, where Lily of the Valley (also known as Maybells) bloom from May to June. The field covers 15 hectares and is the largest in Japan. It opened to the public in 1963, but had to be closed in 1975 due to damage from overpicking and trampling. It was able to open again ten years later..
 The UFO park (Set up as a UFO observation platform, it was later closed in the 1970s-1980s.)

Culture

Mascot

His name is a pun on "be lucky". He is a tomato with a horn and hooves of a bull, a pig's nose and a lily of a valley on his back. His birthday is 12 September.

Notable people
Shigeru Kayano (1926–2006), leading figure in the Ainu ethnic movement.
Ryo Fukui (1948-2016), jazz pianist.

See also
 Cultural Landscapes of Japan

References

External links

Official Website 
Biratori Nibutani Ainu Culture Museum Website 
Nibutani Takumi no Michi website

Towns in Hokkaido
Biratori, Hokkaido